This is a list of members of the Argentine Chamber of Deputies from 10 December 2019 to 9 December 2021.

Composition

By province

By political groups

Election cycles

List of Deputies 

The table is sorted by provinces in alphabetical order, and then with their deputies in alphabetical order by their surnames. All deputies start their term on December 10, and end it on December 9 of the corresponding years, except when noted.

Notes

References

External links
List of deputies on the official website (archived) 

2019
2019 in Argentina
2020 in Argentina
2021 in Argentina